Baron Airedale, of Gledhow in the West Riding of the County of York, was a title in the Peerage of the United Kingdom. It was created on 17 July 1907 for the Liberal politician Sir James Kitson, 1st Baronet, who had previously represented Colne Valley in the House of Commons and served as Lord Mayor of Leeds. Kitson had already been created a Baronet, of Gledhow in the West Riding of the County of York, in the Baronetage of the United Kingdom 1886. Variations of the name Kitson included Kittson whose family crest incorporated a demi-unicorn. This unicorn is evident in the Airedale crest atop the arms granted to James Kitson, 1st Baron Airedale in 1907. Both the title (Barony) and Baronetcy became extinct on the death of his grandson, the fourth Baron, in 1996.

Barons Airedale (1907)
James Kitson, 1st Baron Airedale (1835–1911)
Albert Ernest Kitson, 2nd Baron Airedale (1863–1944)
Roland Dudley Kitson, 3rd Baron Airedale (1882–1958)
Oliver James Vandeleur Kitson, 4th Baron Airedale (1915–1996)

Arms

References

Extinct baronies in the Peerage of the United Kingdom
Noble titles created in 1907
Noble titles created for UK MPs